The 2011 Supercopa de España was a two-legged Spanish football match-up that was played on 14 and 17 August 2011. It was contested by Barcelona, the 2010–11 La Liga winners, and Real Madrid, the 2010–11 Copa del Rey winners. Barcelona won 5–4 on aggregate for their tenth Supercopa de España title.

Match details

First leg

Second leg

See also
El Clásico
2011–12 FC Barcelona season
2011–12 Real Madrid CF season

References

2011–12 in Spanish football cups
FC Barcelona matches
Real Madrid CF matches
2011
El Clásico matches